The California Hotel and Casino (also known as The Cal) opened in 1975 at a cost of $10 million with a hotel and casino located in Downtown Las Vegas, Nevada near the Fremont Street Experience.  When it opened it had 325 rooms which has since been expanded to 781.

The California has been owned by Boyd Gaming since it was built by Sam Boyd.

After facing slow business initially, Boyd soon began focusing on the Hawaiian market, offering Hawaiian food and encouraging a more casual atmosphere.  He introduced vacation packages from the islands, with charter airfares as low as $9.90.  An estimated 80-90% of visitors to Las Vegas from Hawaii stay at a Boyd property.  Boyd's Hawaiian marketing, which extended to the Fremont and Main Street Station with their later acquisitions, is credited with helping to build a large Hawaiian community in Las Vegas, which is sometimes called "the ninth island".

In 1989, the hotel designated the term Golden Arm, after Stanley Fujitake rolled dice for three hours and six minutes in craps without losing.

In 1994 an additional tower was added and the remainder of the hotel was remodeled.  The property is connected to Main Street Station by an enclosed walkway.

A multimillion-dollar redesign and renovation was announced in December 2015, and was completed in December 2016. The project included three new openings: Holo Holo – The Happy Bar, the Cal Sports Lounge, and Redwood Steakhouse. A Hawaiian cuisine restaurant, Aloha Specialties, was renovated as well. By the time of completion, work had already begun on updating 435 guest rooms and 56 suites in the west hotel tower with new carpet, fixtures, and furniture. The hotel renovation was expected to be finished in early 2017.

Notes

Further reading

External links 

 

Casinos in the Las Vegas Valley
Downtown Las Vegas
Skyscraper hotels in Las Vegas
Boyd Gaming
Casinos completed in 1975
Hotel buildings completed in 1975
Hotels established in 1975
1975 establishments in Nevada
Casino hotels